Drum-Taps, first published in 1865, is a collection of poetry written by American poet Walt Whitman during the American Civil War.

18 additional poems were added later in the year to create Sequel to Drum-Taps.

History

Creating the publication

On April 12, 1861, Confederate cannons fired upon Fort Sumter signaling the opening of the American Civil War. Consequently, this would also mark the beginning of a very important time in the life of American poet Walt Whitman. Whitman's style of writing drew from his attempts to better manage the psychological chaos he experienced.

As the nation began to dramatically shift, so did Whitman. His poetry during this time would begin to demonstrate his vision of democracy as people acting collectively and pragmatically to secure a meaningful political freedom. Regarding many of the poems in Drum-Taps, little is known about when they were actually written. However, in the winter of 1862, Whitman traveled to Virginia in search of his brother, George, who he heard had been wounded in the Battle of Fredericksburg. 

After witnessing the vast amount casualties of war at the hospital, Walt was profoundly moved. For the next three years, he would devote himself to helping wounded soldiers. Many considered him a nurse and he acted as one, dutifully dressing wounds, assisting in amputations and administering medications. Whitman, however, insisted he be referred to as something simpler, calling himself a mere "visitor & consolatory," one who brought "soothing invigoration" to the sick and wounded. This time in the hospital would have a major effect on his poetry with some of the poems in Drum-Taps being directly based on events transpired in these places. Whitman found great richness to being in the military camps. He was fascinated by the men and wrote letters for them. His experiences here would fill his notebook as rough-draft poems that constitute his 1865 publication. Years later, Whitman told Horace Traubel that Drum-Taps was "put together by fits and starts, on the field, in the hospitals as I worked with the soldier boys."

Publishing process
How to go about getting this work published would prove to be a tedious affair. By June 23, 1864, Whitman was on the verge of a mental breakdown and grew to be so terribly ill from all the work he had been doing in the hospitals that he was forced to retire to his home in Brooklyn. He managed to declare himself "gradually alleviated, until now I go about pretty much the same as usual" on July 24 and dedicated himself to, at last, publishing his collection of poems. "I intend to move heaven & earth to publish my Drum-Taps as soon as I am able to go around", Whitman told his friend and associate William O'Connor. He was excessively motivated to get his work out there, but an obstacle had developed. Ironically, it was the perception that his past works had been so highly controversial that had now scared off any legitimate publishers from wanting to buy his fresh compilation of poetry. If this were to be the case, Whitman explained to O’Connor, “I shall probably try to bring it out myself, stereotype it, & print an edition of 500 – I could sell that number by my own exertions in Brooklyn and New York in three weeks." O'Connor was not as confident. He was justifiably concerned that a privately published book would not be available to a large scale. It was his desire to have this book cement Whitman's fame. He was going to have to wait for this however.  Whitman's dedication to the hospital remained true as well for he would return to Washington as soon as he was physically fit to. 

Months later, on March 6, 1865, he received a letter from his mother explaining that George, who had survived the poor conditions experienced at many prisoner of war camps, had been released and was now going home to Brooklyn on medical leave. Walt now desperately wanted to be home. Not only so he could see his brother, but he also felt with the way the war was progressing so well now for the Union, this was the perfect time to publish his book. He was only able to gain minimal momentum however after receiving some money from the government. On this date, Whitman signed a contract with printer Peter Eckler to produce five hundred copies of Drum-Taps. Things began to proceed smoothly until the morning of April 15, 1865, when the newspapers told the story of the assassination of President Lincoln. Like the rest of the country, Whitman was deeply saddened by his passing. Over the following months he would split time between Brooklyn and the capital while also adding several additions to his compilation of poems. His poem "When Lilacs Last in the Dooryard Bloom'd" was extremely popular. It was this success (Roy Morris Jr. later wrote that this would be the final success of his career) that finally led to the publication of Drum-Taps, along with a 24-page insert called Sequel to Drum-Taps, on October 28, 1865.

Contents and themes

Patriotism and the purpose of war
Whitman's writings in Drum-Taps appear to be separated into different loosely congregated sections without plainly saying this. Within the first group of poems, Whitman expresses both exuberance and doubts in regard to the imminent conflict. Both Lincoln and Whitman had a like-minded philosophy that the sole objective of the war was to preserve the "more perfect union." Lincoln often expressed this belief and stated that the issue of slavery should be and only would be addressed if it contributed to this preservation. Poems in this first section such as “First O Songs of Prelude” (originally “Drum Taps”) demonstrate this vociferous Unionist pride. That poem and others like it among the first part, such as "Song of the Banner at Daybreak," serve as a rallying cry for the Northern population. 

These poems also demonstrate Whitman's belief that this war is a good thing for America's ideals. He believes that, without such a conflict and threat to society, those ideals could be taken for granted and lost to decay. It seems that war takes binary oppositions, people at all different levels of society, and tethers them together toward a righteous and common purpose. However, Whitman also knows, at least aesthetically at this point, that war does have its horrors.  He conveys this through the poem "The Centenarian's Story" in which a veteran of George Washington's campaign in the Revolutionary War recalls for a Civil War volunteer both the heroism and bravery of watching men charge willingly into terribly perilous situations and the horror of watching a large proportion of this mass of men be slaughtered.

Imagery

The next group of poems is unique in Whitman's work. These poems present a mode of seeing unarguably associated with the discovery and development of photography. Poems such as "Cavalry Crossing a Ford", "Bivouac on a Mountain Side", "An Army Corps on the March", and "By the Bivouac's Fitful Flame" all vividly describe an army that is on the move during a hard day's march, at rest as the daytime fades away, the sensation of marching into combat, and the sleepless night of a soldier sitting at a fire's side, respectively. It is with this vigorous imagery that Whitman describes the evolution of the participants in this war. For example, "By the Bivouac’s Fitful Flame" relentlessly describes the hollow feeling a soldier begins experience as his naïve enthusiasm for war slips away and he must now come to grips with the terror and suffering of conflict. The poet's sense of the ennobling struggle abates and now he presented with a challenge to prove his strength in the face of such terror. Much the same way that the Union must demonstrate its strength in the face of this conflict it has feared for over a decade. Whitman's imagery is interesting in how it shifts between poems. These poems have easy-rhyming rhythms that strip away his fondness of bombastic complexity and simply reports what is there (almost in the same way as a journalist). Conversely, poems in other sections have no such simple flow, instead using free verse which forces the reader to discover this higher meaning before they can even truly enjoy the poem.

Suffering in the Civil War
Drum-Taps also explores the great suffering, death, and injury that occurred during the Civil War. Poems range from the unequivocal suffering experienced by a mother who learns of the wounding and consequential death of her son in "Come Up from the Fields Father" to the camaraderie of "Vigil Strange I Kept on the Field One Night" which tells the story of a soldier who watches one of his fellow soldiers die at his side before continuing on in the battle he is engaged in. During the night he later returns to the corpse to pay his respects to his dead friend and recall how much this young man meant to him in life one last time. "Come Up From the Fields Father" gives a reader perspective into wide reach that the suffering of war has. It mocks any sense of security a reader might have in regard for war as it demonstrates that war can cause one suffering whether they are on a battlefield in Gettysburg or a farm in Kansas. John Burroughs, Whitman's early biographer, after gaining the perspective from Whitman of what his goal with Drum-Taps was, would write that "War can never be to us what it has been to the nations of all ages down to the present; never the main fact--the paramount condition, tyrannizing over all the affairs of national and individual life; but only an episode, a passing interruption." 

General Robert E. Lee would also famously comment that “It is well that war is so terrible — lest we should grow too fond of it.” Ironically, it is this terrible pain and suffering synthesized in war that also creates such intimate bonds among the men who participate in, illustrated in "Vigil Strange." This poem is interesting in that it does not stretch to melodrama to exaggerate the tragic reality of war but rather to mock the poet's futile effort to keep up with it. It is only when the sun has set and the battle ends that the poet can go properly grieve his departed companion, telling the corpse of the great passion he had for him in life.

From the hospital
The last major theme that is consistent throughout a considerable proportion of the poems shows the perspective of the war from the hospitals. The significance of this theme is that the poet chooses not to focus on the grand events happening on the fields but the consequences of those events and the repercussions they had. A poem that goes to great lengths to demonstrate the immense power of this after-effect is "The Wound-Dresser". This poem tells the story of a veteran who, in the beginning of the story, is being badgered by children to tell them war stories. The veteran proceeds to recall his days as a soldier, but only to say that they are not what he remembers best. He drops to his knees and with vivid imagery recollects his days working in the hospitals—this, of course, being supplied by Whitman who claimed this time to be the most profound experience of his life. He remembers the soldiers—not as a whole or a group though—as individuals and by each of their particular wounds. The veteran comes to the realization that providing care to fellow human beings in need is the deepest experience that life can provide. This poem provides the reader with much of the experience of war without every directly recounting one. It shows how war is remembered by the outcome of it, how it was recovered from. It explains how the entirety of the fighters are not heading toward similar fates but how alike soldiers are given entirely different fates. Finally, it states that there is no great bond that occurs in this life than the one that takes place between one who will perish without assistance and the one tends to that person. Furthermore, the poem develops the idea of a tender so that he develops into a Christ-like figure.

Another poem that describes this magnitude of aftermath is "The Artillery Man's Vision". The flashback in this poem is quite different from the one in "The Wound-Dresser". It does not pertain a memory being voluntarily remembered on but instead a fantasy that has abducted the sleepless veteran. This is interesting for two reasons. Its nocturnal setting where a man fails to get any sleep and is instead forced to relive some of the cruelest times in his life is consistent with what we now refer to as post-traumatic stress. The other is the severity that this occurs with. The dream is so vivid and so realistic that it could easily pass for reality, yet the man is able to maintain the truth that this is all an illusion. This leads one to wonder how faithfully this vision is depicting reality. In other words, it seems that the horror of the actual history is so brutal that it has taken over the imagination and is wreaking havoc. From these poems, it is clear to see the extent to which Whitman is able to observe the effects of war.

Poems
The collection originally consisted of 53 poems:
 "Drum-Taps" 
 "Shut not your doors to me proud Libraries" 
 "Cavalry crossing a ford" 
 "Song of the Banner at Day-Break" 
 "By the bivouac's fitful flame" 
 "1861" 
 "From Paumanok starting I fly like a bird"
 "Beginning my studies" 
 "The Centenarian's Story" 
 "Pioneers! O Pioneers!"
 "Quicksand years that whirl me I know not whither"
 "The Dresser" 
 "When I heard the learn'd Astronomer" 
 "Rise O Days from your fathomless deeps" 
 "A child's amaze"
 "Beat! beat! drums!" 
 "Come up from the fields father"
 "City of ships" 
 "Mother and babe" 
 "Vigil strange I kept on the field one night" 
 "Bathed in war's perfume"
 "A march in the ranks hard-prest, and the road unknown  
 "Long, too long, O land" 
 "A sight in camp in the day-break grey and dim" 
 "A farm picture"
 "Give me the splendid silent sun" 
 "Over the carnage rose prophetic a voice" 
 "Did you ask dulcet rhymes from me?" 
 "Year of meteors" 
 "The Torch" 
 "Years of the unperform'd" 
 "Year that trembled and reel'd beneath me" 
 "The Veteran's vision" 
 "O tan-faced Prairie-boy" 
 "Camps of green" 
 "As toilsome I wander'd Virginia's woods" 
 "Hymn of dead soldiers"
 "The ship" 
 "A Broadway pageant" 
 "Flag of stars, thick-sprinkled bunting" 
 "Old Ireland" 
 "Look down fair moon" 
 "Out of the rolling ocean, the crowd" 
 "World, take good notice" 
 "I saw old General at bay" 
 "Others may praise what they like"
 "Solid, ironical, rolling orb" 
 "Hush'd be the camps to-day"
 "Weave in, weave in, my hardy soul" 
 "Turn, O Libertad" 
 "Bivouac on a mountain side" 
 "Pensive on her dead gazing, I heard the mother of all" 
 "Not youth pertains to me"

See also
 Sequel to Drum-Taps

References

Sources
 Foote, Shelby. The Civil War: A Narrative. New York: Random House.
 1958. Fort Sumter to Perryville. 
 1963. Fredericksburg to Meridian.
 Gutman, Huck. 2011. "'Drum-Taps' (1865)." The Walt Whitman Archive, edited by J. R. LeMaster and D. D. Kummings.
 Ignoffo, Matthew F. 1975. What the War Did to Whitman: A Brief Study of the Effects of the Civil War on the Mind of Walt Whitman. New York: Vantage.
 Lehrer, Jonah. 2008. Proust Was a Neuroscientist. Boston: Houghton Mifflin.
 Mack, Stephen John. 2002. The Pragmatic Whitman: Reimagining American Democracy. Iowa City: University of Iowa.
 Morris, Roy. 2000. The Better Angel: Walt Whitman in the Civil War. Oxford England: Oxford University Press.
 Roper, Robert. 2008. Now the Drum of War: Walt Whitman and His Brothers in the Civil War. New York: Walker & Company.

External links

Drum-Taps public domain book at One More Library.

Whitman's Drum Taps and Washington's Civil War Hospitals in archive.org

American Civil War books
Poetry by Walt Whitman
American poetry collections
1865 books